The Covered Bridge Historic District, in Delaware Township, Hunterdon County, New Jersey, is a  historic district along County Route 604, Pine Hill Road, and Lower Creek Road.  It was listed on the National Register of Historic Places on March 5, 1999, for its significance in architecture, settlement, and transportation.  The listing included seven contributing buildings, two contributing structures, and three contributing sites.

Description
It is a mill hamlet/farmstead located on Wickecheoke Creek several miles upstream from where it joins the Delaware River, at the point where the creek cuts down from the Hunterdon Plateau.  It includes Green Sergeant's Covered Bridge (a covered bridge bringing County Route 604 over the creek), two other bridges, two mill sites, three houses, a schoolhouse, and a large barn complex.  The site was in use probably by the 1750s.

The Opdyke-Sergeant House was built in 1754 using stone block in a Georgian style for John Opdyke and his wife Margaret. The property was sold to Charles Sergeant in 1805. The Sergeant-Reading Tenant House features Colonial Revival style.

Gallery

References

External links

Delaware Township, Hunterdon County, New Jersey
National Register of Historic Places in Hunterdon County, New Jersey
Historic districts on the National Register of Historic Places in New Jersey
Georgian architecture in New Jersey
Colonial Revival architecture in New Jersey
New Jersey Register of Historic Places